The Kantonales Kulturzentrum Palais Besenval (″Cantonal Cultural Center Palais Besenval″) was a state cultural center in the Swiss town of Solothurn that existed from 1990 to 2000. It was located in the Palais Besenval at Kronengasse 1 and served mainly as a Kunsthalle (art exposition hall).

History 

The cultural center was founded on May 6, 1990 by the Kuratorium für Kulturförderung des Kantons Solothurn (″Board of Trustees for Cultural Promotion of the Canton of Solothurn″). It occupied the ground floor (two exhibition rooms with a total of 230 m² and a documentation center) and the garden (560 m²) of the Palais Besenval, while the upper floor was occupied by the Solothurn Office of Justice. The logo of the cultural center was designed by Hans Küchler.

The purpose of the cultural center was the ″inner cantonal exchange of contemporary art″, the ″expansion of the cultural network within the canton″, the ″promotion of cultural exchange beyond the canton's borders″ and the ″documentation on art, culture and customs″. Like the Begegnungszentrum Waldegg for the intercantonal area, the Palais Besenval saw itself as an ″intra-cantonal bridge from person to person, from region to region…″ (Peter André Bloch, 1990). The cultural center mainly organized art exhibitions. Several times, the board of trustees combined fine art with literature, such as with the exposition of Friedrich Dürrenmatt′s Bilder, Zeichnungen und Skizzen (″pictures, drawings and sketches″) at the Solothurn Literature Days (1991), or the ″friendship of painters″ between Hermann Hesse and Cuno Amiet (1998).

After ten years of operation, the cultural center fell victim to the tax policy austerity package SO Plus: the Executive Council of Solothurn decided to close the cultural center and advertised the ground floor and the garden of the Besenval Palace for rent. With its exhibition Totentanz from April to May 2000, the cultural center heralded its end. On August 31, 2000, the Cantonal Cultural Center Palais Besenval was dissolved. In the following years, the canton centralized its cultural activities at Waldegg Castle.

Exhibitions (selection)

References

Further reading 
  (Literary text about the creation of an art exhibition in the Cantonal Cultural Center Palais Besenval)

External links 
 
 
 

Solothurn
1990 establishments in Switzerland
Contemporary art galleries in Switzerland
Arts organizations established in 1990
Arts organizations disestablished in 2000